Pāuatahanui Wildlife Reserve is a wetland reserve at the eastern edge of the Pāuatahanui Inlet of the Porirua Harbour in Porirua, New Zealand. The reserve contains the most significant area of saltmarsh in the lower North Island of New Zealand. It also includes tidal mudflats, shrub lands and regenerating coastal forest. The reserve is managed by a committee of Forest & Bird representatives in association with the Department of Conservation.

History 
The area had previously degraded into a wasteland that included a go-cart track, playing fields, demolition spoil, farm land and a cattleyards. Work on restoration began in 1984.

In 1985 the area was made into a Wildlife Management Reserve. This involved the development of ponds, walking tracks and viewing hides. The reserve was officially opened on 15 April 1989.

In the Wellingtonian of the Year awards 2009, Wanda Tate was recognised with the Environment Award, for 17 years work on restoring the Pāuatahanui Wildlife Reserve.  Tate also won the Annual National Golden Spade award from Forest and Bird, and a QSM for her work on conservation.

Plants 
The habitats in the reserve range from tidal mudflats to coastal forest.  The main wetland species are reeds, rushes, harakeke, raupō, glasswort, sea primrose,  New Zealand spinach, half-star, and wild celery.  The coastal scrub includes coastal tree daisy, marsh ribbonwood,  ngaio,  taupata, kãnuka and mānuka. The rare succulent Thyridia repens is also found.

Birds 
Many different native and exotic birds can be found at the Pāuatahanui Wildlife Reserve, including the bar-tailed godwit, royal spoonbill, caspian tern, paradise duck, pied stilt, sacred kingfisher, white-faced heron, Australasian shoveler, pūkeko and black shag.

In the areas of regenerating bush, the birds that can be seen include tūī, grey warblers and fantails.

In April 2017, twenty-two fernbirds were released into the reserve, in a translocation from Lake Rotokare Scenic Reserve in Taranaki.  Fernbirds have been seen in the reserve in the following years.

Freshwater fish 
The Pāuatahanui stream flows through the wildlife reserve at the south-eastern corner of the inlet.  This stream provides habitat for native and threatened fish species including inanga, longfin eel, giant kōkopu, and redfin bully.

Gallery

References

External links

 Pāuatahanui Wildlife Reserve map
 Guardians of Pāuatahanui Inlet

Protected areas of the Wellington Region
Wetlands of the Wellington Region
Nature reserves in New Zealand
Landforms of the Wellington Region